Donald Mayhew is an American politician serving in the Missouri House of Representatives. He won his first election from district 121 in 2018 after defeating Democrat Matt Heitz 69.3% to 30.7%. After redistricting in 2022, he won reelection in district 124.

Electoral History

State Representatives

References

Republican Party members of the Missouri House of Representatives
21st-century American politicians
Living people
Year of birth missing (living people)